is a major highway in the Hokuriku and Kansai regions of central Japan. The  highway begins at an intersection with National Routes 7, 17, 49, 113, and 116 in Chūō-ku, Niigata. It travels southwest across central Honshu, connecting the prefecture capitals: Toyama, Kanazawa, Fukui, and Ōtsu.  In Kyoto it travels concurrently with National Route 1 toward its endpoint at an intersection with National Routes 9, 24, and 367 in Shimogyō-ku, Kyoto.

Route description

Length: 
Origin: Chūō-ku, Niigata (originates at junction with Routes 7, 17, 49, 113 and 116)
Terminus: Shimogyō-ku, Kyoto (ends at Junction with Routes 9, 24 and 367)
Major cities: Sanjō, Nagaoka, Kashiwazaki, Joetsu, Itoigawa, Toyama, Takaoka, Kanazawa, Hakusan, Komatsu, Fukui, Tsuruga, Maibara, Hikone, Ōtsu

History
The origins of the road that is now National Route 8 can be traced back to the Hokurikudō, a road that was established after the Taika Reform to link Kyoto to the capitals of the region by that went by the same name.

The modern history of the highway saw its establishment by the Cabinet of Japan on 4 December 1952 as First Class National Highway 8 from Niigata to Kyoto. On 1 April 1965 it was re-designated as General National Highway 8. On 7–9 February 2018, heavy snowfall shut down the highway for over 60 hours in Fukui Prefecture before it could be removed.

Intersecting routes

in Niigata Prefecture
Routes 7, 17, 18, 49, 113, 116, 148, 252, 253, 292, 350, 351, 352, 353, 403 and 460
in Toyama Prefecture
Routes 41, 156, 160, 415, 470, 471 and 472
in Ishikawa Prefecture
Routes 157, 159, 305, 360, 364 and 416
in Fukui Prefecture
Routes 27, 158, 161, 305, 365, 416, 417 and 476
in Shiga Prefecture
Routes 1, 21, 161, 303, 305, 306, 365, 421, 422 and 477
in Kyoto Prefecture
Routes 9, 24 and 367

In popular culture

Gallery

See also

References

External links

008
Roads in Fukui Prefecture
Roads in Ishikawa Prefecture
Roads in Kyoto Prefecture
Roads in Niigata Prefecture
Roads in Shiga Prefecture
Roads in Toyama Prefecture